The Taiwan Stock Museum is a museum in Songshan District, Taipei, Taiwan.

History
The museum was planned and created by the Taiwan Depository and Clearing Corporation. It was opened on 24 December 2012 in a ceremony officiated by Financial Supervisory Commission Chairperson Ding Kung-wha and Vice Chairperson Wu Tang-chieh.

Exhibitions
The museum hosts an exhibition on the derivation and evolution of shares, the relationship between the development of the Taiwanese stock market and Taiwan's economic progress, and the impact of stock trading on society, among others. It consists of five exhibition areas, notably the Introductory Area, the History Area, the Economic Development Area, the Theater Area and an Assembly Room.

Transportation
The museum is accessible from Zhongshan Junior High School Station of Taipei Metro.

See also
 List of museums in Taiwan

References

External links

 

2012 establishments in Taiwan
Museums established in 2012
Museums in Taipei